"Drinking Class" is a song written by Josh Kear, David Frasier and Ed Hill and recorded by American country music artist Lee Brice. It was released in September 2014 as the second single from his third studio album, I Don't Dance.

Critical reception
Billy Dukes of Taste of Country gave the song a favorable review, calling it "Brice's finest moment" and "a song that can't be ignored." Dukes also wrote that "there's not a hardworking American who won't relate to this song on some level."

Music video
The music video was directed by Ryan Smith and premiered in November 2014.

Commercial performance
"Drinking Class" debuted at number 48 on the US Billboard Country Airplay chart for the week of September 13, 2014. It also debuted at number 44 on Hot Country Songs for the week of August 30, 2014. As of May 2015, the song has sold 742,000 copies in the United States. In December 2015, it was declared the number one song of the year on the Billboard Country Airplay chart, making it the third song in that chart's history to do so without placing at number one at any point during the year; it peaked at number 2. On October 18, 2017, the song was certified platinum by the RIAA.

Charts

Year-end charts

Certifications

References

2014 songs
2014 singles
Lee Brice songs
Curb Records singles
Songs written by Josh Kear
Songs written by Ed Hill
Billboard Country Airplay number-one singles of the year
Songs written by David Frasier